Niconnor (Nico) Alexander (born 4 February 1977 in San Fernando) is a sprinter from Trinidad and Tobago who specialized in the 100 metres.

He attended Abilene Christian University, Texas, USA and graduated with a BS in industrial technology in 2003.

International competitions

References
Sports Reference profile

External links
Best of Trinidad

1977 births
Living people
Trinidad and Tobago male sprinters
Pan American Games medalists in athletics (track and field)
Athletes (track and field) at the 1999 Pan American Games
Athletes (track and field) at the 2003 Pan American Games
Olympic athletes of Trinidad and Tobago
Athletes (track and field) at the 2000 Summer Olympics
Athletes (track and field) at the 2004 Summer Olympics
Abilene Christian University alumni
Pan American Games silver medalists for Trinidad and Tobago
People from San Fernando, Trinidad and Tobago
Medalists at the 2003 Pan American Games
Central American and Caribbean Games medalists in athletics